Mengejar Matahari is a 2004 Indonesian coming-of-age drama film directed by Rudi Sujarwo. It was shown at the International Film Festival Rotterdam in 2005.

Mengejar Matahari is a coming of age story of four childhood friends living in a Jakarta ghetto whose bonds are tested as they grow into adulthood.

References

2004 films
2004 drama films
2000s coming-of-age drama films
2000s teen drama films
Indonesian teen drama films
Indonesian coming-of-age drama films